Zlatnik may refer to:

 Zlatník, village and municipality in Vranov nad Topľou District in the Prešov Region of eastern Slovakia
 Zlatnik, Višegrad, village in the municipality of Višegrad, Bosnia and Herzegovina